XHLCM-FM is a radio station on 95.7 FM in Lázaro Cárdenas, Michoacán. It is owned by Radiorama and carries the La Poderosa grupera format.

History
XELCM-AM 920 received its concession on February 24, 1993. It has always been owned by Radiorama. In 2011, it was cleared to move to FM.

References

Radio stations in Michoacán
Radio stations in Mexico with continuity obligations